The 1991 Miami Dolphins season was the team's 26th as a member of the National Football League. The Dolphins failed to improve upon their previous season's output of 12–4, winning only eight games and failing to qualify for the playoffs.

Offseason

NFL Draft

Personnel

Staff

Roster

Regular season

Schedule

Note: Intra-division opponents are in bold text.

Standings

References

Miami Dolphins seasons
Miami Dolphins
Miami Dolphins